Chrášťany is a municipality and village in Prague-West District in the Central Bohemian Region of the Czech Republic. It has about 1,000 inhabitants.

References

Villages in Prague-West District